The 1943 San Francisco Dons football team was an American football team that represented the University of San Francisco as an independent during the 1943 college football season. In their second season under head coach Al Tassi, the Dons compiled a 1–7 record and were outscored by their opponents by a combined total of 199 to 13.

The Dons' one victory came against the 1943 Nevada Wolf Pack football team led by Marion Motley; it was the Wolf Pack's only loss of the 1943 season.

Schedule

References

San Francisco
San Francisco Dons football seasons
San Francisco Dons football